Gaussia is a genus in the  palm family, native to Mexico, Central America and the Greater Antilles. They are solitary, unarmed, and have pinnately compound leaves.  The trees have enlarged bases and prop-roots.

Taxonomy
There are five species in the genus:
G. attenuata which is found in Puerto Rico
G. gomez-pompae which is found in the Mexican states of Chiapas, Oaxaca and Veracruz
G. maya which is found in Mexico, Belize and Guatemala
G. princeps which is found in western Cuba
G. spirituana which is found in the Sierra de Jatibonico in east-central Cuba.

References

 
 George Proctor. 2005. Arecaceae (Palmae).  Pp. 135–153 in Pedro Acevedo-Rodriguez and Mark T. Strong. Monocots and Gymnosperms of Puerto Rico and the Virgin Islands. Contributions from the United States National Herbarium Volume 52.

External links

 
Arecaceae genera
Trees of the Caribbean
Neotropical realm flora